Eretria is an ancient city in Greece.

Eretria may also refer to:
Eretria (moth), a genus of moth
Eretria (Shannara), a character in the Shannara series of fantasy novels
Eretria (Thessaly), a town of ancient Thessaly, Greece